Saefullah (11 February 196416 September 2020) was an Indonesian bureaucrat and teacher. He primarily served in the regional government of Jakarta, reaching the rank of regional secretary in 2014. He had previously served as appointed mayor of Central Jakarta between 2010 and 2014, following a seven-year career in Jakarta's educational offices. He died in 2020 due to COVID-19.

Early life and education
Saefullah was born on 11 February 1964 in Cilincing, North Jakarta, in the administrative village (kelurahan) of Rorotan. He studied in Bekasi for his elementary school, and in Jakarta's public schools for middle and high school. He studied at a teachers' school instead of a regular high school.

He later studied and obtained degrees from Muhammadiyah Teachers' Institute (1988), Jakarta State University (2000), and Padjadjaran University (2009).

Career
After graduating from teachers' school in 1982, Saefullah began teaching as a semi-permanent honorary teacher until 1984, when he became a formal civil servant as an elementary teacher in Manggarai, Central Jakarta. He became headmaster after eight years of teaching and superintendent after another six years. He was promoted to head of the education office in West Jakarta in 2003. By 2004, he was head for middle school education for the whole of Jakarta, and was further promoted to head of the youth and sports office for Jakarta in 2009.

Saefullah was appointed mayor of Central Jakarta on 4 November 2010. During this tenure, he worked on relocating street vendors from Tanah Abang and Monas, and was also appointed commissioner to Persija Jakarta in 2013 while the football club was experiencing a financial crisis and player strikes.

On 11 July 2014, then-acting governor Basuki Tjahaja Purnama appointed Saefullah into the post of Jakarta's regional secretary, the highest-ranked bureaucratic office in the provincial government. The position had been nominally vacant at that time since April 2013 due to the resignation of the previous holder. Saefullah had previously participated in a competency test for the position. According to Basuki, while another bureaucrat Sylviana Murni had placed higher in the competency test, Saefullah was appointed due to his younger age.

In March 2016, Saefullah had been elected as chairman for the Jakarta branch of Nahdlatul Ulama. He stated his intention to run for the 2017 Jakarta gubernatorial election and received an endorsement from the National Awakening Party, though he did not end up running. He very briefly served as acting governor of Jakarta between the end of Djarot Saiful Hidayat's term on 15 October 2017 and the start of Anies Baswedan's term the following day; he referred to the length of his tenure as 40 hours (24 hours on 15 October, and 16 hours on 16 October). His five-year appointment as regional secretary, which would have expired in October 2019, was extended by Baswedan in July 2019. He was proposed by Gerindra in November 2019 as a potential vice governor to replace Sandiaga Uno, though the office went to Ahmad Riza Patria.

Death
Saefullah, alongside West Jakarta mayor Uus Kuswanto, were confirmed to have tested positive for COVID-19 on 13 September 2020, during the COVID-19 pandemic in Indonesia. He had previously been admitted to a hospital since as early as 8 September due to stomach problems. He died at noon on 16 September 2020, due to COVID-19-induced septic shock and acute respiratory distress syndrome.

On the same day as his death, he was buried at his family's grave in Cilincing, with grave workers wearing biohazard outfits according to safety protocols.

References

1964 births
2020 deaths
People from Jakarta
Governors of Jakarta
Indonesian civil servants
Deaths from the COVID-19 pandemic in Indonesia
Mayors and regents of places in Jakarta
Padjadjaran University alumni
Jakarta State University alumni
Betawi people
Indonesian Sunni Muslims
Mayors of places in Indonesia